Rodrigo Moreno (born October 1972 in Buenos Aires) is an Argentine film director and screenplay writer.  He works mainly in the cinema of Argentina.

According to Joel Poblete, who writes for Mabuse, a cinema magazine, Rodrigo Moreno is one of the members of the so-called "New Argentina Cinema" which began c. 1998.

Biography
Moreno studied cinema and graduated from the directing program at the Universidad del Cine, Buenos Aires, Argentina, where he has been teaching directing and screenplay writing since 1996.

Many of his films have been critically hailed at various international film festivals.  In 1993, he wrote and directed his first short film, Nosotros, which won best film at the Bilbao International Festival of Documentary and Short Films.

His 2006 film, his first film feature he directs alone, is The Minder. His 2011 film A Mysterious World premiered In Competition at the 61st Berlin International Film Festival and was nominated for the Golden Bear.

Filmography
 Nosotros (1993) (Short: 8 min.)
 Mala época (1998) (co-directed)
 El Descanso (2002) (co-directed)
 El Custodio (2006), aka The Minder
 R.D. Kell´s The signal (2007) TV film (co-directed)
 A Mysterious World (2011)
 Reimon (2012) (in production)

Awards
Wins
 Mar del Plata Film Festival: FIPRESCI Prize Best Latin-American Film; for Mala época. For its original conception that combines various aspects of contemporary life expressing the young filmmakers point of view; Special Mention, for Mala época; 1998.
 Toulouse Latin America Film Festival: Audience Award; for Mala época; 1999.
 Sundance Film Festival: NHK Award, for The Minder (Latin America); 2005.
 Berlin International Film Festival: Alfred Bauer Prize, for El Custodio; 2006.
 Bogota Film Festival: Golden Precolumbian Circle; Best Director; Best Film; for El Custodio; 2006.
 Lleida Latin-American Film Festival: ICCI Screenplay Award, for El Descanso; 2003.
 Donostia-San Sebastián International Film Festival: Horizons Award; Special Mention; for El Custodio; 2006.

Nominations
 Torino International Festival of Young Cinema: Prize of the City of Torino Best Film; International Feature Film Competition; for Mala época; 1998.
 Argentine Film Critics Association Awards: Silver Condor; Best First Film; for Mala época (2000).
 Buenos Aires International Festival of Independent Cinema: Best Film; for El Descanso; 2001.
 Argentine Film Critics Association Awards: Silver Condor; Best First Film; for  El Descanso; (2003).
 Berlin International Film Festival: Golden Berlin Bear; for El Custodio; 2006.

References

External links
 

1972 births
Argentine film directors
Argentine screenwriters
Male screenwriters
Argentine male writers
Living people
People from Buenos Aires